Ziveh Dar (also Romanized as Zīveh Dār; also known as Sīveh Dar, Siwadar, Zīvar Dār, and Zobeydār) is a village in Chalanchulan Rural District, Silakhor District, Dorud County, Lorestan Province, Iran. At the 2006 census, its population was 50, in 11 families.

References 

Towns and villages in Dorud County